Daerim (Guro-gu Office) Station is a station on the Seoul Subway Line 2 and Line 7. The station is located just south of the Han River in Yeongdeungpo-gu. The Line 2 station is elevated, while the Line 7 station is underground.

Station layout

Line 2

Line 7

References

Metro stations in Yeongdeungpo District
Metro stations in Guro District, Seoul
Seoul Metropolitan Subway stations
Railway stations opened in 1984
1984 establishments in South Korea
20th-century architecture in South Korea